The Journal of Tissue Viability is a quarterly peer-reviewed medical journal covering all aspects of the occurrence and treatment of wounds, ulcers, and pressure sores. It is published by Elsevier.

History
The journal was established in 1991 with P Shakespeare as its founding editor-in-chief. It is the official publication of the Tissue Viability Society and its current editor-in-chief is Dan Bader (University of Southampton).

Abstracting and indexing
The journal is abstracted and indexed in:
Index Medicus/MEDLINE/PubMed
Scopus
Science Citation Index Expanded
Social Sciences Citation Index
Current Contents/Clinical Medicine
CINAHL
According to the Journal Citation Reports, the journal has a 2017 impact factor of 1.925.

References

External links

English-language journals
Dermatology journals
Elsevier academic journals
Quarterly journals
Publications established in 1991